The Sea Beyond is an Italian television series that first aired on Rai 2 on September 23, 2020. It was created by Cristina Farina.

The first season premiered in Italy on September 23, 2020, and ended on October 28, 2020. The second one debuted on November 17, 2021, ending on December 22.

Premise 
Carmine Di Salvo and Filippo Ferrari are arrested on the same day in Naples, but they seem to have nothing in common: the former dreams of becoming a professional hairdresser, despite being born into a Neapolitan Camorra family from which he would only like to escape to build an honest future; the second, on holiday in the Campania capital with three friends, is a promising pianist born into a very wealthy family in Milan. The two teenagers are locked up in the juvenile prison of Naples: if Carmine, born into the world of crime, knows its rules perfectly, for Filippo instead it is like having landed on another planet whose language he even struggles to understand (the Neapolitan one). Both are immediately noticed by the inmate Ciro Ricci, son of a Camorra boss and also established himself as a boss within the walls of the penitentiary, who begins to torment them with the help of his loyalists. In the women's sector comes Naditza, a gypsy who was arrested on purpose for the umpteenth time with the aim of escaping the will of her parents, guilty of wanting to impose an arranged marriage on her as per the tradition of the Roma people.

Inmates have particularly difficult histories: some come from criminal families and have no intention of changing their lives;  others have made mistakes because they were exasperated by abuse and mistreatment; still others, born into honest families, have been fascinated by the so-called "system" and the illusion of the comfort it would guarantee.

To try to make the inmates understand that it is possible to radically change direction and live honestly are the director Paola Vinci, the commander of the penitentiary police Massimo Esposito, the educator Beppe Romano and the various guards. Each of them, in their own way and with different methods, tries to demonstrate to the young prisoners that a different way is always possible.

Cast and characters

Episodes

Production 
The series is conceived by Cristiana Farina, who is also co-author of the Scriptment together with Maurizio Careddu. Produced by Rai Fiction and Picomedia, the series is filmed in the naval base of the Navy located in via Acton in Naples. In the series we note other significant places in the city such as the Maschio Angioino, the Caracciolo seafront, Galleria Umberto I, the Rione Sanità and Montesanto districts, various streets in the historic centre, the Toledo underground station, the Centro direzionale, Posillipo as well as the port of Salerno and Palazzo Coppola and the arcades of Cava de' Tirreni.

While the first season was still on the air, producer Roberto Sessa confirmed the start of writing for a second season, the filming of which began on April 19, 2021, for a duration of nineteen weeks.

At the end of the last episode of the second season, the third season was announced, then officially confirmed in January 2022, the shooting of which began in the spring of the same year.

In March 2022, when the third season was still in the works, the decision to renew the series for the fourth season was confirmed. In January 2023, when the third season was about to be released, the series had another renewal for the fifth and sixth seasons as well.

Release 
The first and second seasons were first broadcast by Rai 2 in 2020 and in 2021, and the episodes were added to the catalog of the RaiPlay platform a few hours after broadcasting on linear TV. The only exceptions were episodes 1 and 2 of the second season, which were instead distributed by RaiPlay two days before the broadcast on Rai 2.

In May 2022, however, Rai lost the rights to distribute the series, which was consequently removed entirely from its video-on-demand platform. On June 10, 2022, the first two seasons of the series were added to the Netflix catalog, and only at this point did the series become a cult phenomenon, gaining great attention from audiences and critics. 

For the third season of the series, however, the rights for broadcasting via streaming return to RaiPlay, which on February 1, 2023, publishes the first six episodes thus anticipating the first viewing on linear TV. RaiPlay, on the same date, also republished the first two seasons that had been removed a year earlier.

On February 13, 2023, RaiPlay released the remaining six unedited episodes. On the platform it ranks at the top of the ranking of the most viewed on-demand serial programs in a single day with almost 2.7 million views in 24 hours and from September 2020 up to that moment the fiction has had 80 million views overall.

During the same period, the first two seasons of the series continue to be popular on Netflix. The broadcast on linear television of the third season (for the first time already fully distributed in streaming) began on February 15, 2023.

Thanks to the production and distribution company Beta Film, the series was distributed in France, Germany, Scandinavia and Spain. and is also viewable in Latin America, Israel and the Nordic countries. Internationally, it is known under the title The Sea Beyond.

Music

Season 3 
The soundtrack of the third season composed by Stefano Lentini was released on February 1, 2023.

References

External links 
 

2020s Italian television series
2020 Italian television series debuts